The Conquest of Constantinople is a 1951 Turkish adventure film directed by . It was the first film of the "Ottomans v. Byzantines" genre which became very popular in Turkey. The film depicts the Fall of Constantinople (1453). It was shown in the United States in 1954.

Cast 
 Sami Ayanoğlu – Mehmed II
 Resit Gürzap – Candarli Halil Pasha
 Cahit Irgat – Constantinos XI

See also
 List of Islamic films

References

External links 
 

1951 adventure films
Fall of Constantinople
Films set in the 1450s
1951 films
Cultural depictions of Mehmed the Conqueror
Turkish black-and-white films
Turkish adventure films